"Teamwork" is the eighth episode of the sixth season of House. It aired on November 16, 2009. This episode marks the departure of Jennifer Morrison from the series, since it was stated by Fox that Morrison's character would be written out of the series by the middle of season six.

Plot
After House's medical license is reinstated, he reclaims his role as Head of Diagnostics in time to treat Hank Hardwick (guest star Troy Garity), an adult film star admitted to Princeton Plainsboro for pulsating eye pain. Cameron and Chase decide to leave Princeton Plainsboro in order to save their relationship after Dibala's death. Throughout the episode, House tries to reassemble his old team of Foreman, Cameron, Chase, Thirteen, and Taub. Taub and Thirteen initially ignore House's attempts to get them to come back. The patient's and his wife's jobs in porn make the team confront him about how dedicated they really are to each other.

House orders an STD panel, a tox screen, an ANA to look for autoimmune, a patient history, a lumbar puncture to rule out viral encephalitis, and asks to have a c-reactive protein sent to the lab to look for inflammation. Foreman has to do all this himself. During the lumbar puncture, the patient has tetany - his arm muscles contract. House goes to Taub, who says the only link between the eye and muscle is the brain, and suggests a tumor or a seizure. House then asks Thirteen who states she has an interview with a community health clinic and doesn't give an opinion. House takes her comment on her trip to Thailand as a suggestion that the patient's condition is multifocal. Foreman says cerebral vasculitis would explain the eye and arms, so House tells him to start the patient on steroids, to do a brain angiogram to confirm, and to get an EMG and nerve biopsy as well. When Foreman convinces Chase to remain on the team for the remainder of the case by telling him "you owe me this", he and Cameron agree to finish the case. Foreman gets Chase to do the brain angio.

Cameron thinks it could be a severe vitamin D deficiency, since the patient has a restrictive diet and works long hours indoors. This would explain all the patient's symptoms. Chase decides to take Hank to the phototherapy suite, blast him with ultra-violet light and give him IV vitamins as well as do the brain angio. During the UV light session, the patient gets a nosebleed and petechial hemorrhages - bleeds in his leg. This new symptom rules out both Cameron and Foreman's diagnoses. The patient's blood won't clot. Foreman notes that the UV rays made his capillaries more fragile, which sped up the onset of DIC. Cameron thinks a widespread petechial rash and nervous system involvement indicates a blood infection. She suggests meningococcemia. The team starts him on heparin for the DIC and broad-spectrum antibiotics for the infection. However, the patient soon gets a fever, meaning the antibiotics aren't working.

House goes to Taub again, who tells him he's happy at home and work. He berates House for his addiction to addictions and how he's trying to avoid his problem by solving a different problem, which won't work. He says his work helps people, and gives an example of a patient who got a nose job when he couldn't breathe with his nose after a car-crash, and has an idea. He says the antibiotics wouldn't work if the patient's sinuses were infected and clogged, if there was a pocket of bacteria his blood vessels couldn't reach. He says the antibiotics will work if they surgically drain the patient's sinuses.

Foreman asks Thirteen to come back, but she resolutely turns him down. Soon, the patient's liver begins to fail, and his abdomen fills with fluid. Cameron suggests a klatskin tumor obstructing his bile ducts. Foreman says he's not jaundiced and there wouldn't be ocular effects, but Chase states that inflammation inside the bile channels would mean sclerosing cholangitis, which would explain all the symptoms. This would stop him producing clotting proteins and damage his blood cells causing small strokes. The team preps the patient for an ERCP to open his bile channels.

During the ERCP, Chase and Cameron find the patient's liver is filled with worms. The patient has strongyloides - threadworms. The worms spread throughout the patient's body causing all his symptoms. He most likely got the worms from his sexual activity. The patient gets two mebendazole pills. However, the patient's lungs fill with fluid and become severely compromised. Foreman suggests lymphoma. Peritoneal carcinomatosis explains the liver failure and paraneoplastic syndrome explains everything else. House orders chemotherapy. He also tells them to fax the latest update to Taub and Thirteen.

The patient suddenly has blood in his urine , and he goes into cardiac arrest. They manage to stabilize him, but he has no red or white cells and almost no platelets either. Foreman suggests aleukemic leukemia meaning the marrow wouldn't be making normal cells. House tells them to ablate the patient's bone marrow, despite the team's arguments that this could kill the patient. He faxes this information and information on the patient's condition to Taub and Thirteen for their opinions. They both are shown to ignore the fax. However, as Thirteen receives a message from the community clinic she applied to, she ignores it and looks at House's fax. Taub looks at the fax as he talks to a rather silly patient, and dumps it in the bin. They both call House as the team is about to ablate the patient's marrow.

They reason that the patient's body went to hell hours after the worms were gone because the worms were helping him. They diagnose extra-intestinal Crohn's. The patient lived in a super-clean environment as a kid. It's the hygiene - why there's so much autoimmune disease in developed places and almost none in developing places. The worms were keeping the Crohn's in check and "teaching his immune system what it should've learned eating dirt growing up", but once they were gone, the Crohn's started to run rampant. The team starts the patient on methylprednisolone and helminths.

Meanwhile, Wilson scolds Cuddy for thinking her dating Lucas wouldn't affect House. He says she at least should have told him, so he wouldn't have coached House on how to win Cuddy's affection. Cuddy tells Wilson she's not going to let House affect her relationships, but goes home to Lucas and panics. Lucas says that either she thought they could go on happily with their relationship and not be found out by House, or she thought they wouldn't be together for long. He notes that the former would be Cuddy was delusional, and the latter would mean he was. He also says the only other option would be that Cuddy thought House had matured, which would bring them back to Cuddy being delusional.

Lucas goes to the doctor's lounge and looks through the team's files, looking for anything on them to help keep them to prevent House from being miserable so Cuddy won't be miserable. Wilson thinks House just wants his old team members back as he feels abandoned by Cuddy and wants people he knows. He tells House he can't solve a deeper problem with a surface solution.

During the episode, House talks to Cameron about her leaving the hospital. He says her human-loving nature contradicts the way she's simply forgiving Chase for what he did. Cameron thinks House is simply trying to blow her marriage. House however, gives three reasons for why she's acting weird: his firing Chase is what made her leave the team two years ago, when what Chase did finally hits Cameron their marriage will 'blow up', and finally, the only thing stopping Cameron working at the hospital will be gone. He also suggests to Chase that Cameron might be forgiving him because she loves him, but that there could be another explanation. This stirs doubt in Chase's mind, and he asks Cameron her reason for forgiving him, noting she's been harder on the patient than on him. She explains that Chase feels shame and guilt for what he's done, unlike Hank.

House tells Chase his theory on Cameron's reaction. He thinks Cameron feels it was House's fault that Chase did what he did, saying he created the foul climate for it to happen. Cameron tells House to stop his game of trying to hire Thirteen and Taub. This outburst makes Chase realize she's mad at House but not him. He says he did it, and he won't leave the hospital just because Cameron wants to pretend he didn't do it.

Chase eventually meets House at his front door and tells him he wants to remain on the team. At the end of the episode Cameron confirms that her anger was directed towards House as the source of the atmosphere leading to Dibala's murder. She confronts House by saying he ruined Chase's life making him "unable to see right or wrong and not to see the sanctity of human life". Cameron admits her former love for Dr. House – which has disappeared as a result of recent events, along with her love for Chase (as he was when she first met him). She puts her hand out to shake House's hand and he does not accept – much like the end of season three – and she kisses him on the cheek, signaling she is leaving the diagnostic team. Cameron leaves the team but Chase continues working with House, along with Foreman, Thirteen, and Taub.

In the closing scenes, Thirteen is shown treating the patient and she and Foreman look at each other until Foreman leaves. Taub talks to his wife, who is upset with him returning to diagnostics. Cameron is shown walking out on Chase with her bags packed and giving him a tearful hug.  Lucas and Cuddy also walk through the lobby of Princeton-Plainsboro with House watching them from above.

Music

Golden Cage (The Whitest Boy Alive)
Where Did You Go? (Jets Overhead)

References

External links
 
Music and References from Tv.com

House (season 6) episodes
2009 American television episodes
Television episodes directed by David Straiton

fr:Classé X (Dr House)
it:Episodi di Dr. House - Medical Division (sesta stagione)#Lavoro di squadra